Ananda Mohan College is an undergraduate evening college in north Kolkata. It started in 1961 as the evening branch of City College while Rammohan College started functioning as the morning branch. City College was founded by patriotic Brahmo leader Ananda Mohan Bose. The college is located at 102/1, Raja Rammohan Roy Sarani, Kolkata-700 009. It was one of the City Group colleges administered by Brahmo Samaj Education Society, a registered society, constituted by the Sadharan Brahmo Samaj, Kolkata. From 2017, it became a grant-in-aid college no longer administered by the Brahmo Samaj.

About college
The college was accredited by NAAC at the B+ level in 2016.

It offers undergraduate courses in humanities (Bengali, English, Hindi (elective course), history, philosophy, and Sanskrit), social sciences (economics and political science), physical sciences (chemistry, geography and environmental studies (elective course), and physics), biological sciences (botany, physiology, and zoology), mathematics, computer science, and commerce.

Another institution with the same name is Ananda Mohan College, Mymensingh, Bangladesh. It was also established by Ananda Mohan Bose at his place of birth. Other than being started by the same person and having the same name, the two institutions are not related.

Notable alumni
Biplab Chatterjee, actor

See also 
List of colleges affiliated to the University of Calcutta
Education in India
Education in West Bengal

References

External links 
 

Universities and colleges in Kolkata
Academic institutions associated with the Bengal Renaissance
Educational institutions established in 1961
University of Calcutta affiliates
Universities and colleges affiliated with the Brahmo Samaj
1961 establishments in West Bengal